Forest Heights Academy of Excellence is an academic/visual & performing arts magnet school located on Sumrall Drive and is part of East Baton Rouge Parish Public Schools.  it is a National Blue Ribbon school.

The school serves students in Kindergarten through Fifth Grade.

Admission Requirements

Students must be performing on or above grade level in reading and math as determined by assessment test, report cards and/or teacher recommendation.  Students must also have a 2.5 overall grade point average.  Kindergarten students will be tested to determine eligibility.

School uniforms
Students are required to wear school uniforms.
No boots allowed.

References

External links
 

`1

Public elementary schools in Louisiana
Schools in East Baton Rouge Parish, Louisiana
Magnet schools in Louisiana